The Anacampserotaceae are a family of plants proposed in the February 2010 issue of the journal Taxon. The family was described by Urs Eggli and Reto Nyffeler in their analysis of the polyphyly in the suborder Portulacineae (order Caryophyllales). The new family and its circumscription was based on molecular and morphological data. The three recognized genera - Anacampseros, Grahamia, and Talinopsis - were formerly placed in the Portulacaceae and comprise a total of 36 known species. This family was accepted in the Angiosperm Phylogeny Group's 2009 publication of the APG III system.

References

 
Caryophyllales families